The 1991 African Women's Championship was the inaugural edition of the currently-named Women's Africa Cup of Nations, invoked to determine CAF's single qualifier for the inaugural edition of the FIFA Women's World Cup that year. Nigeria defeated Cameroon in the final to win its first title and earn qualification.

Eight teams were originally scheduled to play in the tournament, but four of them withdrew, with Cameroon reaching the final on two walkovers.

Participating teams
The eight participating teams were:

 
 
 
 
 
 
 
 

The teams who withdrew in italics.

Bracket

Final Tournament

First round

|}

Nigeria won 7–2 on aggregate.

Senegal withdrew: Guinea advanced.

Zimbabwe withdrew, Zambia advanced.

Congo withdrew, Cameroon advanced.

Semifinals

Nigeria won 7–0 on aggregate.

Zambia withdrew, Cameroon advanced.

Final

Nigeria won 6–0 on aggregate and also qualified for the 1991 FIFA Women's World Cup.

Awards

External links
 Tournament profile at RSSSF

1991 in women's association football
Women's Africa Cup of Nations tournaments
1991 FIFA Women's World Cup qualification
1991 in African football